The Goldney River is a river in the Canterbury region of New Zealand. It arises on the southern slopes of the Craigieburn Range and flows south into Lake Coleridge. The Goldney family were early squatters in the area.

See also
List of rivers of New Zealand

Notes

References
Land Information New Zealand - Search for Place Names

Rivers of Canterbury, New Zealand
Rivers of New Zealand